Silver Moon is the second studio album by Norwegian pop group Donkeyboy, released on 2 March 2012 by Warner Music. The album peaked at number 2 on the Norwegian Albums Chart and number 35 on the Danish Albums Chart.

Singles
 "City Boy" was released as the lead single on 29 November 2011, which became a number-one hit in Denmark and Norway.
 "Pull of the Eye" was released as the second single from the album on 27 February 2012.
 "Silver Moon" was released as the 3rd single from the album on 10 August 2012.

Track listing 

(*) denotes co-producer
Credits adapted from album liner notes.

Charts

References

Donkeyboy albums
2012 albums